Nuh ibn Asad (نوح بن اسد; d. 841/842) was a Samanid ruler of Samarkand (819-841/2). He was a son of Asad.

In 819, Nuh was granted authority over the city of Samarkand by Caliph Al-Ma'mun's governor of Khurasan, Ghassan ibn 'Abbad, as a reward for his support against the rebel Rafi' ibn Laith. In 839/840, Nuh captured Isfijab and constructed a wall around it to protect the city from the nomadic pagan Turks living near the borders of the Samanid state. Nuh continued to rule over the city until his death in 841 or 842. Abdallah, the governor of Khurasan, then appointed two of Nuh's brothers, Yahya and Ahmad, to jointly rule over Samarkand.

Sources
 

840s deaths
Samanids
9th-century monarchs in Asia
People from Samarkand
Year of birth unknown
9th-century Iranian people